The Red Book of Ossory is a medieval manuscript produced in Kilkenny, Ireland, and kept in St Canice's Cathedral. The manuscript contains a number of texts in Latin and in Anglo-Norman. The sixth gathering of the MS contains the Proverbes de bon enseignement by Nicholas Bozon. The Latin religious lyrics in the manuscript were intended to replace more secular songs in the vernacular, and were composed by Richard de Ledrede, Bishop of Ossory.

References

Irish manuscripts
Latin manuscripts
Kilkenny (city)
Medieval manuscripts